Linda Lombardi is an American writer and editor specializing in animals.
Lombardi worked as an academic linguist at the University of Maryland, College Park and was known for her works on phonology and optimality theory until she quit her tenured job to become an animal keeper.

Books

Animals
 The Pit Bull Life, co-authored with Deirdre Franklin, Countryman Press 2016
 The Lemur's Cry, Wombatarama 2014
 The Sloth's Eye, Five Star Mysteries 2012
 Animals Behaving Badly: Boozing Bees, Cheating Chimps, Dogs with Guns, and Other Beastly True Tales, Penguin/Perigee 2011

Linguistics
 Laryngeal Features and Laryngeal Neutralization, Garland 1994 (Routledge 2018)
 Segmental Phonology in Optimality Theory,  Cambridge University Press 2001

References

External links
Personal website

American phonologists
Living people
Linguists from the United States
21st-century American women writers
20th-century American women scientists
University of Maryland, College Park faculty
University of Massachusetts Amherst alumni
Animal trainers
Zookeepers
Year of birth missing (living people)